Lepanthes is one of the largest genera of flowering plants in the world, with over 1000 species:

A

Lepanthes abitaguae Luer & L.Jost
Lepanthes abortiva Luer & R.Escobar
Lepanthes absens Luer & Hirtz
Lepanthes acarina Luer
Lepanthes aciculifolia Luer
Lepanthes acoridilabia Ames & C.Schweinf.
Lepanthes acrogenia Luer & R.Escobar
Lepanthes actias-luna Luer & Hirtz
Lepanthes aculeata Luer
Lepanthes acuminata Schltr.
Lepanthes acunae Hespenh.
Lepanthes acutissima Luer & R.Escobar
Lepanthes adamsii Hespenh.
Lepanthes adelphe Luer & Hirtz
Lepanthes adrianae Luer
Lepanthes aduncata Luer & R.Escobar
Lepanthes aeora Luer & Hirtz
Lepanthes affinis Luer & R.Escobar
Lepanthes aggeris Luer & R.Escobar
Lepanthes agglutinata Luer
Lepanthes aguirrei Luer
Lepanthes aithalos Carnevali & I.Ramírez in G.A.Romero & G.Carnevali
Lepanthes alcicornis Luer & R.Escobar
Lepanthes alkaia Luer & R.Escobar
Lepanthes allector Luer & R.Escobar
Lepanthes almolongae Luer & Béhar
Lepanthes alopex Luer & Hirtz
Lepanthes alticola C.Schweinf.
Lepanthes alvarezii P.Ortiz
Lepanthes amabilis Luer
Lepanthes amphioxa Luer & Hirtz
Lepanthes amplectens Luer & Hermans
Lepanthes amplior Luer & R.Escobar
Lepanthes amplisepala Luer & R.Escobar
Lepanthes anatina Luer & R.Escobar
Lepanthes anchorifera Luer
Lepanthes ancylopetala Dressler
Lepanthes andreettae Luer
Lepanthes anfracta Garay & Dunst.
Lepanthes angulata Luer & Hirtz
Lepanthes anisoloba Dod ex Luer
Lepanthes ankistra Luer & Dressler
Lepanthes anserina Luer & R.Escobar
Lepanthes antennata Luer & R.Escobar
Lepanthes antennifera Luer & R.Escobar
Lepanthes antilocapra Luer & Dressler
Lepanthes antiopa Luer
Lepanthes antioquiensis Schltr.
Lepanthes aperta Luer
Lepanthes apiculata Dod ex Luer
Lepanthes appendiculata Ames
Lepanthes applanata Luer & Sijm
Lepanthes aprica Catling & V.R.Catling
Lepanthes aprina Luer & L.Jost
Lepanthes aquila-borussiae Rchb.f.
Lepanthes arbaceae Luer & Cloes
Lepanthes arbuscula Luer & R.Escobar
Lepanthes arenasiana Bogarín & Mel.Fernández
Lepanthes arethusa Luer & R.Escobar
Lepanthes argentata Luer & R.Escobar
Lepanthes ariasiana Luer & L.Jost
Lepanthes aries Luer
Lepanthes aristata Luer & R.Escobar
Lepanthes asoma Luer & Hirtz
Lepanthes athena Luer
Lepanthes atomifera Luer & R.Escobar
Lepanthes atrata Endres ex Luer
Lepanthes attenuata Salazar
Lepanthes atwoodii Luer
Lepanthes aubryi Luer & H.P.Jesup
Lepanthes auditor Luer & R.Escobar
Lepanthes aurea Urb.
Lepanthes aures-asini Luer & R.Escobar
Lepanthes auriculata Luer
Lepanthes aurita Luer & R.Escobar
Lepanthes aurorae D.E.Benn. & Christenson
Lepanthes auspicata Luer & R.Escobar
Lepanthes austinae Dod ex Luer
Lepanthes avicularia Luer & Hirtz
Lepanthes avis Rchb.f.

B

Lepanthes bahorucana Hespenh. & Dod
Lepanthes ballatrix Luer
Lepanthes barbae Schltr.
Lepanthes barbatula Luer & R.Vásquez
Lepanthes barbelifera Luer & Hirtz
Lepanthes barbigera Luer & L.Jost
Lepanthes barbosae Luer
Lepanthes beatriziae Luer & R.Escobar
Lepanthes beharii Luer
Lepanthes benzingii Luer
Lepanthes biappendiculata Luer
Lepanthes bibarbullata Luer
Lepanthes bifalcis Luer
Lepanthes bifurcata Luer & R.Escobar
Lepanthes biglomeris Luer & R.Escobar
Lepanthes bilabiata Fawc. & Rendle
Lepanthes biloba Lindl.
Lepanthes binaria Luer & Hirtz
Lepanthes bipinnatula Luer & R.Escobar
Lepanthes bipollicaris Luer & Hirtz
Lepanthes bitriangularis Luer & R.Escobar
Lepanthes bituberculata Luer & Hirtz
Lepanthes bivalvis Luer & Sijm
Lepanthes blepharantha Schltr. in I.Urban
Lepanthes blephariglossa Schltr.
Lepanthes blepharistes Rchb.f.
Lepanthes blepharophylla (Griseb.) Hespenh.
Lepanthes boomerang Dod ex Luer
Lepanthes boyacensis Luer & R.Escobar
Lepanthes braccata Luer & Dod
Lepanthes brachypogon Luer
Lepanthes brachystele Salazar & Soto Arenas
Lepanthes bradei Schltr.
Lepanthes branchifera Luer & R.Vásquez
Lepanthes brasiliensis Pabst
Lepanthes breedlovei Salazar & Soto Arenas
Lepanthes brenneri Luer
Lepanthes brevis Luer & R.Vásquez
Lepanthes brunnescens Luer
Lepanthes bustyla Luer
Lepanthes byfieldii Hespenh.

C

Lepanthes cacique-tone Luer & R.Escobar
Lepanthes cactoura Luer & R.Escobar
Lepanthes caesariata Luer & R.Escobar
Lepanthes calimae P.Ortiz
Lepanthes calliope Luer & Hirtz
Lepanthes callisto Luer & Hirtz
Lepanthes calocodon Luer
Lepanthes calodictyon Hook.
Lepanthes calopetala Salazar & Soto Arenas
Lepanthes calophlebia Luer & Thoerle
Lepanthes caloptera Luer
Lepanthes caloura Luer & Hirtz
Lepanthes caluffii E.González & Luer
Lepanthes calypso Luer & Hirtz
Lepanthes calyptrata Luer
Lepanthes campodostele Luer & Hirtz
Lepanthes camptica Luer & Hirtz
Lepanthes canaliculata Luer & R.Escobar
Lepanthes candida Endres ex Luer
Lepanthes capistrata Luer & Sijm
Lepanthes capitana Rchb.f.
Lepanthes caprimulgus Luer
Lepanthes caranqui Tobar & Monteros, 2021 
Lepanthes cardiocheila Luer & R.Escobar
Lepanthes carinata Luer & Hirtz
Lepanthes caritensis Tremblay & Ackerman
Lepanthes caroli-lueri Bogarín & Pupulin
Lepanthes carunculigera Rchb.f.
Lepanthes carvii Archila
Lepanthes casasae Pupulin
Lepanthes cassicula Hespenh. & Dod
Lepanthes cassidea Rchb.f.
Lepanthes catella Luer & R.Escobar
Lepanthes catlingii Salazar
Lepanthes cauda-avis Luer
Lepanthes caudata Luer & R.Escobar
Lepanthes caudatisepala C.Schweinf.
Lepanthes caudigera Luer & Hirtz
Lepanthes caveroi D.E.Benn. & Christenson
Lepanthes celox Luer & Hirtz
Lepanthes cerambyx Luer & R.Escobar
Lepanthes cercion Luer & R.Escobar
Lepanthes chameleon Ames
Lepanthes chapina Luer & Béhar
Lepanthes chelonion Luer & R.Escobar
Lepanthes chiangii Salazar
Lepanthes chilopsis Luer & Hirtz
Lepanthes chimaera Luer & R.Escobar
Lepanthes chinapintae Luer
Lepanthes chiriquensis Schltr.
Lepanthes chorista Luer & Hirtz
Lepanthes chrysina Luer & Hirtz
Lepanthes chrysostigma Lindl.
Lepanthes ciliaris Luer & Hirtz
Lepanthes ciliicampa Luer & Hirtz
Lepanthes ciliisepala Schltr.
Lepanthes ciliolata Luer & R.Vásquez
Lepanthes cincinnata Luer & R.Escobar
Lepanthes cingens Luer & R.Escobar
Lepanthes circularis Luer
Lepanthes cirrata Luer & Hirtz
Lepanthes clandestina Luer & Hirtz
Lepanthes clareae Luer & Hermans
Lepanthes clarkii Luer
Lepanthes clausa Luer & R.Escobar
Lepanthes cleistogama Archila
Lepanthes climax Luer & R.Escobar
Lepanthes cloesii Luer
Lepanthes cobanensis Archila
Lepanthes cocculifera Luer & R.Escobar
Lepanthes cochleariifolia (Sw.) Sw.
Lepanthes cochliops Luer & R.Vásquez
Lepanthes coeloglossa Luer
Lepanthes cogolloi Luer & R.Escobar
Lepanthes columbar Luer
Lepanthes comadresina Luer
Lepanthes complicata Luer & R.Vásquez
Lepanthes composita Luer & R.Escobar
Lepanthes concavella Luer & Hirtz
Lepanthes conchilabia Luer & Hirtz
Lepanthes conchyliata Luer
Lepanthes conconula Luer & Hirtz
Lepanthes condorensis Luer & Hirtz
Lepanthes confusa Ames & C.Schweinf.
Lepanthes confusoides Luer
Lepanthes conjuncta Luer & Hirtz
Lepanthes constanzae Urb.
Lepanthes contingens Luer
Lepanthes convexa Hespenh.
Lepanthes cordata Luer & R.Escobar
Lepanthes cordeliae Luer
Lepanthes cordilabia Luer
Lepanthes corkyae Luer & Hirtz
Lepanthes cornualis Luer & R.Escobar
Lepanthes cornutipetala Dod
Lepanthes corrugata Luer & Dalström
Lepanthes costaricensis Schltr.
Lepanthes costata Rchb.f.
Lepanthes cotyledon Luer
Lepanthes cotylisca Luer & Hirtz
Lepanthes craticia Luer
Lepanthes cremasta Luer & Hirtz
Lepanthes cremersii Luer
Lepanthes cribbii Pupulin
Lepanthes crista-piscis Luer & R.Vásquez
Lepanthes crista-pulli Luer & R.Escobar
Lepanthes crucipetala Hespenh. & Dod
Lepanthes crucis Luer & Hirtz
Lepanthes cryptostele Salazar & Soto Arenas
Lepanthes ctenophora Luer & Hirtz
Lepanthes cuatrecasasii Luer
Lepanthes cubensis Hespenh.
Lepanthes cucullata Luer & R.Escobar
Lepanthes culex Luer & R.Escobar
Lepanthes cuneiformis Luer & R.Escobar
Lepanthes cunicularis Luer & R.Escobar
Lepanthes curiosa Luer
Lepanthes cuspidata Luer
Lepanthes cyanoptera Rchb.f.
Lepanthes cyclochila Luer & R.Escobar ex Viveros & W.E.Higgins
Lepanthes cymbium Luer & R.Escobar
Lepanthes cyrillicola Luer & Llamacho
Lepanthes cyrtostele Luer & Hirtz

D

Lepanthes dactyla Garay
Lepanthes dactylina Luer
Lepanthes dalessandroi Luer
Lepanthes darioi Luer & R.Escobar
Lepanthes dasyura Luer & R.Escobar
Lepanthes davidsei Luer
Lepanthes dawsonii Ames
Lepanthes debedoutii P.Ortiz
Lepanthes debilis Luer & R.Escobar
Lepanthes decipiens Ames & C.Schweinf.
Lepanthes declivis Luer & R.Escobar
Lepanthes decoris Luer & Llamacho
Lepanthes decurva Luer & Hirtz
Lepanthes decussata Dod ex Luer
Lepanthes deficiens Luer & R.Escobar
Lepanthes deformis Luer & Hirtz
Lepanthes deleastes Luer
Lepanthes delhierroi Luer & Hirtz
Lepanthes deliciasensis Luer & R.Escobar
Lepanthes deliqua Luer
Lepanthes demissa Luer
Lepanthes denticulata Luer & Béhar
Lepanthes destituta Luer & R.Escobar
Lepanthes detecta Luer & Hirtz
Lepanthes deutera Luer & Thoerle
Lepanthes dewildei Luer & R.Escobar
Lepanthes diabolica Luer & R.Escobar
Lepanthes diaziae Luer
Lepanthes dichroma Luer
Lepanthes dictydion Luer & Hirtz
Lepanthes dictyota Luer & R.Vásquez
Lepanthes dicycla Luer & Hirtz
Lepanthes dicyrtopetala Luer & Hirtz
Lepanthes didactyla Luer & R.Escobar
Lepanthes didyma Luer & Hirtz
Lepanthes discolor Luer & R.Escobar
Lepanthes disjuncta Luer & Hirtz
Lepanthes disticha (A.Rich. & Galeotti) Garay & R.E.Schult.
Lepanthes divaricata Fawc. & Rendle
Lepanthes dodiana Stimson
Lepanthes dodsonii Luer
Lepanthes doeringii Archila
Lepanthes dolabrata Luer & R.Escobar
Lepanthes dolabriformis Luer
Lepanthes domingensis Hespenh. & Dod
Lepanthes dondodii Luer
Lepanthes dorsalis Lindl.
Lepanthes dotae Endres ex Luer
Lepanthes dressleri Hespenh.
Lepanthes droseroides Luer
Lepanthes dryades Luer & R.Escobar
Lepanthes duidensis Ames & C.Schweinf.
Lepanthes dumbo Luer
Lepanthes dunstervilleorum Foldats
Lepanthes dussii Urb.

E

Lepanthes echidion Luer & R.Escobar
Lepanthes echidna Luer & R.Vásquez
Lepanthes echinata Luer & Cloes
Lepanthes echo Luer & Hirtz
Lepanthes eciliata Schltr.
Lepanthes ectopa Luer
Lepanthes edentula Luer
Lepanthes effusa Schltr.
Lepanthes ejecta Luer & Hirtz
Lepanthes ekmanii Schltr. in I.Urban
Lepanthes elaeanorae Foldats
Lepanthes elaminata Luer & Hirtz
Lepanthes elata Rchb.f.
Lepanthes electilis Luer
Lepanthes elegans Luer
Lepanthes elegantula Schltr.
Lepanthes elephantina Luer & R.Escobar
Lepanthes elliptica Fawc. & Rendle
Lepanthes elongata Luer & Hirtz
Lepanthes eltoroensis Stimson
Lepanthes elytrifera Luer & L.Jost
Lepanthes embreei Luer & Hirtz
Lepanthes empticia Luer & Béhar
Lepanthes enca-barcenae Archila
Lepanthes epibator Luer & R.Vásquez
Lepanthes equicalceolata Luer & R.Escobar
Lepanthes equus-frisiae Pupulin & H.Medina
Lepanthes erepsis Luer & Hirtz
Lepanthes erinacea Rchb.f.
Lepanthes eriocampa Luer & Hirtz
Lepanthes eros Luer & R.Escobar
Lepanthes eruca Luer & Hirtz
Lepanthes erucifera Luer & Sijm
Lepanthes erythrocles Luer & R.Escobar
Lepanthes erythrostanga Hespenh. & Dod
Lepanthes erythroxantha Salazar & Soto Arenas
Lepanthes escifera Luer & R.Escobar
Lepanthes escobariana Garay
Lepanthes esmeralda Luer & Hirtz
Lepanthes estrellensis Ames
Lepanthes eumeces Luer
Lepanthes evansiae Luer & Hirtz
Lepanthes exaltata Luer & R.Escobar
Lepanthes excavata Dod ex Luer
Lepanthes excedens Ames & Correll
Lepanthes exigua Luer & L.Jost
Lepanthes exilis C.Schweinf.
Lepanthes eximia Ames
Lepanthes exogena Luer & Hirtz
Lepanthes exotica Hespenh. & Dod
Lepanthes expansa Luer & Hirtz
Lepanthes exposita Luer
Lepanthes exserta Luer & Hirtz

F

Lepanthes falcata Luer & R.Vásquez
Lepanthes falcifera Luer
Lepanthes fascinata Luer
Lepanthes felis Luer & R.Escobar
Lepanthes ferax Luer & R.Escobar
Lepanthes ferrelliae Luer
Lepanthes fibulifera Luer & R.Escobar
Lepanthes filamentosa Luer & Hirtz
Lepanthes fimbriata Ames
Lepanthes fiskei Luer
Lepanthes fissa Luer & Hirtz
Lepanthes flaccida Luer & Hirtz
Lepanthes flexuosa Luer
Lepanthes florencia Dod ex Luer
Lepanthes floresii Luer & Hirtz
Lepanthes focalis Luer
Lepanthes fonnegrae Luer & R.Escobar
Lepanthes forceps Luer & R.Escobar
Lepanthes forcipifera Luer
Lepanthes foreroi P.Ortiz
Lepanthes foveata Luer & R.Escobar
Lepanthes fractiflexa Ames & C.Schweinf.
Lepanthes fratercula Luer & Béhar
Lepanthes frigida Luer
Lepanthes fuchsii Luer
Lepanthes fuertesii Hespenh. & Dod
Lepanthes fugiens Luer
Lepanthes fulva Lindl.
Lepanthes furcata Luer & R.Escobar
Lepanthes furcatipetala Garay
Lepanthes fusiformis Luer

G

Lepanthes gabriellae Salazar & Soto Arenas
Lepanthes gaileana Luer & Hirtz
Lepanthes galeottiana Salazar & Soto Arenas
Lepanthes garayi T.Hashim.
Lepanthes gargantua Rchb.f.
Lepanthes gargoyla Luer & Hirtz
Lepanthes gelata Luer & R.Escobar
Lepanthes gemina Luer & R.Escobar
Lepanthes geminipetala Luer & J.Portilla
Lepanthes gemmula Luer & Hirtz
Lepanthes generi Luer & Hirtz
Lepanthes geniculata Luer & Béhar
Lepanthes georgii Luer & R.Escobar
Lepanthes gerardensis M.A.Blanco
Lepanthes gibberosa Ames
Lepanthes gin-ganii Luer & Thoerle
Lepanthes giraldoi Luer
Lepanthes glabella Luer & Hirtz
Lepanthes glaberrima Luer & R.Vásquez
Lepanthes glacensis Dod
Lepanthes glicensteinii Luer
Lepanthes glochidea Luer
Lepanthes glomerulosa Luer & Hirtz
Lepanthes gloris Luer & Hirtz
Lepanthes glossites Luer
Lepanthes gnoma Luer & Hirtz
Lepanthes golbasto Luer & Hirtz
Lepanthes golondrina Luer & R.Escobar
Lepanthes gossamera Luer & Hirtz
Lepanthes gracillima Endres ex Luer
Lepanthes grandiflora Ames & C.Schweinf.
Lepanthes gratiosa Pupulin & D.Jiménez
Lepanthes greenwoodii Salazar & Soto Arenas
Lepanthes grildrig Luer & R.Escobar
Lepanthes grisebachiana Hespenh.
Lepanthes grossiradix Luer & Hirtz
Lepanthes grypha Luer
Lepanthes guaduasensis Luer & R.Escobar
Lepanthes guanacasensis Luer & R.Escobar
Lepanthes guanacastensis Ames & C.Schweinf.
Lepanthes guardiana Endres ex Luer
Lepanthes guatemalensis Schltr.
Lepanthes guerrerensis Salazar & Soto Arenas
Lepanthes gustavo-romeroi Archila
Lepanthes gustavoi Luer & R.Escobar
Lepanthes gutula-sanguinis Luer & R.Escobar

H

Lepanthes habenifera Luer & R.Escobar
Lepanthes hagsateri Salazar & Soto Arenas
Lepanthes hamiltonii Luer
Lepanthes hamulifera Luer
Lepanthes hastata Luer
Lepanthes helcium Luer & Hirtz
Lepanthes helgae Luer & R.Escobar
Lepanthes helicocephala Rchb.f.
Lepanthes helleri A.D.Hawkes
Lepanthes hemirhoda Garay
Lepanthes heptapus Luer & R.Escobar
Lepanthes hermansii Luer
Lepanthes herpaga Hespenh. & Dod
Lepanthes herrerae Luer & Béhar
Lepanthes herzogii Luer
Lepanthes hexapus Luer & R.Escobar
Lepanthes hippocrepica Luer & R.Escobar
Lepanthes hirpex Luer & R.Escobar
Lepanthes hirsuta Hespenh. & Dod
Lepanthes hirsutula Luer & Hirtz
Lepanthes hirtzii Luer
Lepanthes hispidosa Luer & L.Jost
Lepanthes hoeijeri Luer
Lepanthes hollymountensis Luer & H.P.Jesup
Lepanthes homotaxis Luer & R.Escobar
Lepanthes hondurensis Ames
Lepanthes horichii Luer
Lepanthes horribilis Luer & Hirtz
Lepanthes horrida Rchb.f.
Lepanthes hortensis Luer & R.Escobar
Lepanthes hotteana Hespenh. & Dod
Lepanthes hubeinii Luer
Lepanthes huehuetenangensis Archila
Lepanthes hughsonii Hespenh. & Dod
Lepanthes hurgo Luer & Béhar
Lepanthes hydrae Luer & L.Jost
Lepanthes hymenoptera Luer & Hirtz
Lepanthes hyphosa Luer & R.Escobar
Lepanthes hystrix Luer & Hirtz

I

Lepanthes ibanezii Luer & Béhar
Lepanthes ictalurus Luer
Lepanthes ilensis Dodson
Lepanthes illex Luer
Lepanthes illinizae Luer & Hirtz
Lepanthes imbricans Luer & R.Escobar
Lepanthes imitator Luer & Hirtz
Lepanthes implexa Luer & Hirtz
Lepanthes imposita Luer & R.Escobar
Lepanthes impotens Luer & R.Escobar
Lepanthes inaequalis Schltr.
Lepanthes inaequisepala Luer & J.J.Portilla
Lepanthes inamoena Luer
Lepanthes incantata Luer
Lepanthes incisa Luer & R.Vásquez
Lepanthes incredibilis Luer & R.Vásquez
Lepanthes incurva Dod ex Luer
Lepanthes inescata Luer
Lepanthes ingridiana Luer
Lepanthes inornata Schltr.
Lepanthes insolita Luer & R.Escobar
Lepanthes interiorubra Hespenh.
Lepanthes intonsa Luer
Lepanthes intricata Luer
Lepanthes ionoptera Rchb.f.
Lepanthes iricolor Luer
Lepanthes irrasa Luer & R.Escobar
Lepanthes isabeliae Archila
Lepanthes isochila Luer
Lepanthes isosceles Luer & R.Escobar

J

Lepanthes jackinpyxa Luer & Hirtz
Lepanthes jamboeensis Luer & Hirtz
Lepanthes jamesonii Lindl. ex Rchb.f.
Lepanthes janitor Luer & R.Escobar
Lepanthes janus Luer & R.Escobar
Lepanthes jardinensis Luer & R.Escobar
Lepanthes javieri Archila
Lepanthes jayandella Luer
Lepanthes jesupii Luer
Lepanthes jimburae Luer & Hirtz
Lepanthes jimenezii Schltr.
Lepanthes johnsonii Ames
Lepanthes josei Hespenh. & Dod
Lepanthes jostii Luer
Lepanthes jubata Luer
Lepanthes jugum Luer
Lepanthes juninensis Schltr.

K

Lepanthes katleri Luer
Lepanthes koehleri Schltr.
Lepanthes kuijtii Luer & Hirtz
Lepanthes kokonuko J.S. Moreno & Pisso-Florez

L

Lepanthes labiata Luer
Lepanthes laevis Luer
Lepanthes lanceolata Hespenh.
Lepanthes lancifolia Schltr.
Lepanthes lappacea Luer
Lepanthes larvina Luer & R.Escobar
Lepanthes lasiopetala Garay & Dunst.
Lepanthes latisepala Ames & C.Schweinf.
Lepanthes laxa Luer & J.Portilla
Lepanthes laxiflora Luer
Lepanthes lehmannii Schltr.
Lepanthes lenticularis Luer & Béhar
Lepanthes ligiae Luer & R.Escobar
Lepanthes ligulata Luer & Hirtz
Lepanthes lilijae Foldats
Lepanthes lilliputae Luer & R.Escobar
Lepanthes limbata Luer & R.Escobar
Lepanthes limbellata Endres ex Luer
Lepanthes lindleyana Oerst. & Rchb.f. in H.G.Reichenbach
Lepanthes linealis Luer & R.Escobar
Lepanthes linguifera Garay & Dunst.
Lepanthes lingulosa Luer & R.Escobar
Lepanthes llamachoi Luer
Lepanthes llanganatensis Luer & Hirtz
Lepanthes llipiensis Luer
Lepanthes lloensis Luer
Lepanthes loboauriculatus Archila
Lepanthes loddigesiana Rchb.f.
Lepanthes longiacuminata Luer & Hirtz
Lepanthes longiloba Dod ex Luer
Lepanthes longipedicellata C.Schweinf.
Lepanthes longiracemosa Foldats
Lepanthes lophius Luer
Lepanthes lucifer Luer & Hirtz
Lepanthes luisii Archila
Lepanthes lunaris Luer
Lepanthes lupula Luer & Hirtz
Lepanthes lycocephala Luer & R.Escobar
Lepanthes lymphosa Luer & Hermans
Lepanthes lynniana Luer

M

Lepanthes macalpinii Luer
Lepanthes maccolmiana Luer
Lepanthes machogaffensis Pupulin & D.Jiménez
Lepanthes machorroi Salazar & Soto Arenas
Lepanthes macrantha Garay
Lepanthes macrostylis Luer & R.Escobar
Lepanthes macrotica Luer & Dalström
Lepanthes maduroi Luer
Lepanthes magnifica Luer
Lepanthes magnipetala Dod ex Luer
Lepanthes mairae D.E.Benn. & Christenson
Lepanthes maldonadoae Soto Arenas
Lepanthes mammillata Luer
Lepanthes manabina Dodson
Lepanthes marahuacensis Carnevali & I.Ramírez
Lepanthes marcanoi Hespenh. & Dod
Lepanthes mariae Salazar
Lepanthes mariposa Luer
Lepanthes marshana Luer & L.Jost
Lepanthes martae Luer
Lepanthes marthae Luer & R.Escobar
Lepanthes martineae Luer & Cloes
Lepanthes martinezii Salazar & Soto Arenas
Lepanthes mastix Luer & Hirtz
Lepanthes matudana Salazar & Soto Arenas
Lepanthes maxillaris Luer & Hirtz
Lepanthes maxima Salazar & Soto Arenas
Lepanthes maxonii Schltr.
Lepanthes mayordomoensis L.Jost & Luer
Lepanthes mazatlanensis Solano & Reynaud
Lepanthes medusa Luer & R.Escobar
Lepanthes mefueensis Luer & R.Escobar
Lepanthes megalocephala Luer & R.Vásquez
Lepanthes megalostele Luer
Lepanthes meganthera Luer & Hirtz
Lepanthes mekynochila Garay & Dunst.
Lepanthes melanocaulon Schltr. in I.Urban
Lepanthes meleagris Luer & R.Escobar
Lepanthes melpomene Luer & Hirtz
Lepanthes membranacea Luer & Hirtz
Lepanthes menatoi Luer & R.Vásquez
Lepanthes mendozae Luer & D'Aless.
Lepanthes meniscophora Luer & Hirtz
Lepanthes meniskos Garay & Dunst.
Lepanthes mentosa Luer
Lepanthes mephistopheles Luer & Hirtz
Lepanthes micellilabia Luer & R.Escobar
Lepanthes microdonta Dod ex Luer
Lepanthes microglottis Schltr.
Lepanthes micronyx Luer & R.Escobar
Lepanthes micropetala L.O.Williams
Lepanthes microprosartima Tobar & M.J.Gavil., 2021 
Lepanthes microscopica Luer & R.Escobar
Lepanthes migueliana Luer & Béhar
Lepanthes mimetica Garay & Dunst.
Lepanthes miniflora Dod ex Luer
Lepanthes minima Salazar & Soto Arenas
Lepanthes minutilabia Ames & C.Schweinf.
Lepanthes minutipetala C.Schweinf.
Lepanthes minutissima Endres ex Luer
Lepanthes minyglossa Luer
Lepanthes mirabilis Ames
Lepanthes miraculum Luer & R.Vásquez
Lepanthes mirador Luer & Hirtz
Lepanthes mittelstaedtii Luer & Béhar
Lepanthes mixe Salazar & Soto Arenas
Lepanthes mollis Luer
Lepanthes monilia Luer & R.Escobar
Lepanthes monitor Luer
Lepanthes mononeura Luer & Hermans
Lepanthes monoptera Lindl.
Lepanthes monteverdensis Luer & R.Escobar
Lepanthes montis-narae Pupulin
Lepanthes montis-rotundi P.Ortiz
Lepanthes mooreana Luer & L.Jost
Lepanthes moorei C.Schweinf.
Lepanthes morleyi Luer & Dalström
Lepanthes mornicola Urb.
Lepanthes moscosoi Hespenh. & Dod
Lepanthes motozintlensis Salazar & Soto Arenas
Lepanthes mucronata Lindl.
Lepanthes mulleriana Luer
Lepanthes multiflora C.D.Adams & Hespenh.
Lepanthes muscula Luer & R.Escobar
Lepanthes myiophora Luer
Lepanthes myoxophora Luer & R.Escobar
Lepanthes mystax Luer & R.Escobar

N

Lepanthes nagelii Salazar & Soto Arenas
Lepanthes nana Luer & H.P.Jesup
Lepanthes nanegalensis Rchb.f.
Lepanthes narcissus Luer & Hirtz
Lepanthes nautilus Luer & R.Escobar
Lepanthes navicularis Luer
Lepanthes nebulina Luer & R.Vásquez
Lepanthes necae Archila
Lepanthes necopina Luer & Hirtz
Lepanthes neillii L.Jost
Lepanthes nematodes Luer & R.Escobar
Lepanthes nematostele Luer
Lepanthes nicolasii Luer & R.Escobar
Lepanthes niesseniae Luer
Lepanthes nigriscapa R.E.Schult. & Dillon
Lepanthes niphas Luer & R.Escobar
Lepanthes nitida Luer & Hirtz
Lepanthes nivea Luer
Lepanthes noelii Luer & Béhar
Lepanthes nontecta Luer
Lepanthes norae Foldats
Lepanthes nubicola Rchb.f.
Lepanthes nulla Luer & R.Escobar
Lepanthes nummularia Rchb.f.
Lepanthes nutanticaulis Hespenh. & Dod
Lepanthes nycteris Luer & R.Vásquez
Lepanthes nymphalis Luer

O

Lepanthes oaxacana Salazar
Lepanthes obliquiloba Hespenh.
Lepanthes obovata Luer & R.Escobar
Lepanthes obtusa Fawc. & Rendle
Lepanthes obtusipetala (Fawc. & Rendle) Fawc. & Rendle
Lepanthes occidentalis Hespenh.
Lepanthes octavioi Luer & R.Escobar
Lepanthes octocornuta Luer
Lepanthes octopus Luer & R.Escobar
Lepanthes odobenella Luer & Hirtz
Lepanthes odontocera Luer & Hirtz
Lepanthes odontolabis Luer
Lepanthes ollaris Luer & R.Escobar
Lepanthes olmosii Bogarín
Lepanthes omnifera Luer & Hirtz
Lepanthes opetidion Luer & R.Escobar
Lepanthes ophelma Luer & R.Escobar
Lepanthes ophioglossa Luer
Lepanthes ophiostele Luer
Lepanthes orbella Luer
Lepanthes orchestris Luer & R.Vásquez
Lepanthes ordonezii Luer & Béhar
Lepanthes oreibates Luer & R.Escobar
Lepanthes oreocharis Schltr.
Lepanthes oreophila Catling & V.R.Catling
Lepanthes orion Luer & R.Escobar
Lepanthes ornithocephala L.Jost & Luer
Lepanthes oro-lojaensis Tobar & M.F.Lopez, 2021 
Lepanthes ortegae Luer & Hirtz
Lepanthes oscarii Archila
Lepanthes oscillifera Luer & R.Escobar
Lepanthes osiris Luer & R.Escobar
Lepanthes ostraconopetala Luer & Hirtz
Lepanthes otara Luer
Lepanthes oteroi Luer
Lepanthes otopetala Luer
Lepanthes ova-rajae Luer
Lepanthes ovalis (Sw.) Fawc. & Rendle
Lepanthes oxapampaensis D.E.Benn. & Christenson
Lepanthes oxybaphon Luer & R.Escobar
Lepanthes oxypetala Luer & Hirtz
Lepanthes oxyphylla Luer & R.Vásquez

P

Lepanthes pachoi Luer & R.Escobar
Lepanthes pachyglossa Luer
Lepanthes pachyphylla Luer & Béhar
Lepanthes paivaeana Rchb.f.
Lepanthes palaga Luer & R.Escobar
Lepanthes palatoflora Hespenh. & Dod
Lepanthes palpebralis Luer
Lepanthes pan Luer & Dalström
Lepanthes panicellus Luer & R.Vásquez
Lepanthes panisca Luer & R.Vásquez
Lepanthes panope Luer & R.Escobar
Lepanthes pantomima Luer & Dressler
Lepanthes papallactae Luer & Hirtz
Lepanthes papilio Luer & R.Vásquez
Lepanthes papilionacea Salazar
Lepanthes papillipetala Dressler
Lepanthes papyrophylla Rchb.f.
Lepanthes paradoxa Luer
Lepanthes pariaensis Foldats
Lepanthes parmata Luer & R.Escobar
Lepanthes parvilabia Luer
Lepanthes parvula Dressler
Lepanthes pastoensis Schltr.
Lepanthes pastorellii D.E.Benn. & Christenson
Lepanthes pectinata Luer
Lepanthes pecunialis Luer & Hirtz
Lepanthes pedunculata Luer & Sijm
Lepanthes pelorostele Luer & Hirtz
Lepanthes pelvis Pupulin & D.Jiménez
Lepanthes pelyx Luer & Hirtz
Lepanthes pendens Garay
Lepanthes pendula Luer & L.Jost
Lepanthes penicillata Hespenh. & Dod
Lepanthes penicillifera Luer
Lepanthes pentoxys Luer
Lepanthes perdita Luer & Hirtz
Lepanthes pergracilis Schltr. in I.Urban
Lepanthes persimilis Luer & Sijm
Lepanthes petalolenta Luer & R.Escobar
Lepanthes petalopteryx Luer & R.Escobar
Lepanthes pexa Luer
Lepanthes phalloides Luer & R.Escobar
Lepanthes pholeter Luer
Lepanthes phrixothrix Luer & Hirtz
Lepanthes pictilis Luer & Hirtz
Lepanthes piepolis Dod
Lepanthes pileata Luer & R.Vásquez
Lepanthes pilosa Luer & R.Vásquez
Lepanthes pilosella Rchb.f.
Lepanthes pilosiaures Luer & R.Escobar
Lepanthes pinnatula Luer & R.Escobar
Lepanthes planadensis Luer & R.Escobar
Lepanthes platysepala Luer & R.Escobar
Lepanthes plectilis Luer & Hirtz
Lepanthes pleurorachis Luer
Lepanthes pleurothallopsis Luer & R.Escobar
Lepanthes plumifera Luer
Lepanthes poasensis Luer
Lepanthes politilabia Dod ex Luer
Lepanthes pollardii Hespenh.
Lepanthes polytricha Luer
Lepanthes popayanensis Luer & R.Escobar
Lepanthes porracea Luer & R.Escobar
Lepanthes portillae Luer
Lepanthes posadae Luer & R.Escobar
Lepanthes posthon Luer
Lepanthes praemorsa Luer & R.Escobar
Lepanthes pretiosa Luer & Hirtz
Lepanthes privigna Luer & L.Jost
Lepanthes proboscidis Luer & Hirtz
Lepanthes proctorii Garay & Hespenh.
Lepanthes prolifera Foldats
Lepanthes prora Luer
Lepanthes protuberans Luer & P.Jesup
Lepanthes pseudocaulescens L.B.Sm. & S.K.Harris
Lepanthes pseudomucronata L.Jost & Luer
Lepanthes psomion Luer & Hirtz
Lepanthes psyche Luer
Lepanthes pteroglossa Dod ex Luer
Lepanthes pteropogon Rchb.f.
Lepanthes pterygion Luer & R.Escobar
Lepanthes ptyxis Luer & R.Vásquez
Lepanthes pubes Luer & R.Escobar
Lepanthes pubescens Luer
Lepanthes pubicaulis C.Schweinf.
Lepanthes puck Luer & R.Vásquez
Lepanthes pulchella (Sw.) Sw.
Lepanthes pulcherrima Endrés ex Bogarín & Pupulin
Lepanthes pumila C.Schweinf.
Lepanthes purpurata L.O.Williams
Lepanthes purpurea Luer
Lepanthes purulhaensis Archila
Lepanthes pycnogenia Luer
Lepanthes pygmaea Luer
Lepanthes pyramidalis Luer & R.Escobar

Q

Lepanthes quadrata Fawc. & Rendle
Lepanthes quadricornis Luer & R.Escobar
Lepanthes quadrispatulata Dod
Lepanthes quandi Luer & R.Escobar
Lepanthes quasimodo Luer
Lepanthes quaternaria Luer
Lepanthes quetzalensis Luer & Béhar
Lepanthes quisqueyana Hespenh. & Dod

R

Lepanthes rabei Foldats
Lepanthes racemosa Luer & Hirtz
Lepanthes rafaeliana Pupulin
Lepanthes ramonensis Schltr.
Lepanthes ramosii Luer
Lepanthes rauhii Luer
Lepanthes recurva Luer & Hirtz
Lepanthes refracta Luer
Lepanthes regularis Luer
Lepanthes rekoi R.E.Schult.
Lepanthes renzii Luer
Lepanthes repens Luer
Lepanthes reticulata Luer & R.Escobar
Lepanthes retusa Luer & Hermans
Lepanthes reventador Luer & Hirtz
Lepanthes revoluta Luer & Cloes
Lepanthes rhodophylla Schltr.
Lepanthes rhynchion Luer
Lepanthes ribes Luer
Lepanthes ricaurtensis Luer & R.Escobar
Lepanthes ricii Luer & R.Vásquez
Lepanthes ricina Luer & Dalström
Lepanthes ridicula Luer
Lepanthes rigidigitata Luer & Hirtz
Lepanthes ringens Luer & R.Vásquez
Lepanthes rodrigogonzalesii Archila
Lepanthes rodrigoi Luer
Lepanthes roezliana Luer & R.Escobar
Lepanthes rosoria Luer & Hirtz
Lepanthes rostrata Ames
Lepanthes rotundata Griseb.
Lepanthes rotundifolia L.O.Williams
Lepanthes rubripetala Stimson
Lepanthes rubrolineata Luer & Hirtz
Lepanthes rudicula Luer & Hirtz
Lepanthes rudipetala Hespenh. & Dod
Lepanthes rupestris Stimson
Lepanthes rupicola Schltr.
Lepanthes ruscifolia Rchb.f.
Lepanthes ruthiana Luer & L.Jost
Lepanthes rutkisii Foldats
Lepanthes rutrum Luer & R.Escobar

S

Lepanthes saccata Luer & R.Escobar
Lepanthes salazarii Archila
Lepanthes salpiginosa Luer & Sijm
Lepanthes saltator Luer
Lepanthes saltatrix Luer & Hirtz
Lepanthes samacensis Ames
Lepanthes sanguinea Hook.
Lepanthes sannio Luer & R.Escobar
Lepanthes satyrica Luer & Hirtz
Lepanthes scalaris Luer
Lepanthes scansor Luer & R.Escobar
Lepanthes scapha Luer & Hirtz
Lepanthes schiedei Rchb.f.
Lepanthes schizix Luer
Lepanthes schizocardia Luer
Lepanthes schizura Luer
Lepanthes schnitteri Schltr.
Lepanthes schugii Pupulin
Lepanthes schultesii Salazar & Soto Arenas
Lepanthes scolex Luer
Lepanthes scolops Luer & R.Vásquez
Lepanthes scopula Schltr.
Lepanthes scopulifera Luer & R.Escobar
Lepanthes scrotifera Luer & Hirtz
Lepanthes seegeri Luer
Lepanthes selenitepala Rchb.f.
Lepanthes selliana Endres ex Luer
Lepanthes semilaminata Luer & Hirtz
Lepanthes semperflorens Dod ex Luer
Lepanthes serialina Luer & L.Jost
Lepanthes sericinitens Luer & R.Escobar
Lepanthes series Luer & Hirtz
Lepanthes serriola Luer & R.Vásquez
Lepanthes setifera Luer & R.Escobar
Lepanthes sigsigensis Luer & Hirtz
Lepanthes sijmii Luer & Sijm
Lepanthes silenus Luer & Hirtz
Lepanthes sillarensis Schltr.
Lepanthes silvae H.Dietr.
Lepanthes silverstonei Luer
Lepanthes similis Luer
Lepanthes simplex Hespenh.
Lepanthes singularis Luer & Hirtz
Lepanthes sinuosa Luer & R.Escobar
Lepanthes skeleton Luer & R.Escobar
Lepanthes smaragdina Luer & R.Escobar
Lepanthes sobrina Luer & Hirtz
Lepanthes solicitor Luer & R.Escobar
Lepanthes sororcula Luer & Hirtz
Lepanthes sotoana Pupulin
Lepanthes sotoi Archila
Lepanthes sousae Salazar & Soto Arenas
Lepanthes spadariae Pupulin
Lepanthes speciosa Luer & Hirtz
Lepanthes spelynx Luer & R.Escobar
Lepanthes splendida Luer & Hirtz
Lepanthes spruceana L.Jost & Luer
Lepanthes staatsiana Luer & L.Jost
Lepanthes stalactites Luer & Hirtz
Lepanthes standleyi Ames
Lepanthes stefaniae Archila
Lepanthes stegastes Luer & Hirtz
Lepanthes stelidantha Garay & Dunst.
Lepanthes stelidilabia Luer & R.Escobar
Lepanthes stelidipetala Luer
Lepanthes stellaris Luer & Hirtz
Lepanthes stenophylla Schltr.
Lepanthes stenorhyncha Luer
Lepanthes stenoscleros Schltr.
Lepanthes × stenosepala Luer & Béhar
Lepanthes steyermarkii Foldats
Lepanthes stimsonii Luer
Lepanthes striatifolia Hespenh. & Dod
Lepanthes strumosa Luer & R.Escobar
Lepanthes stupenda Luer
Lepanthes suarezii Salazar & Soto Arenas
Lepanthes suavium Luer & Hirtz
Lepanthes subalpina Urb.
Lepanthes subdimidiata Ames & C.Schweinf.
Lepanthes subulata Luer & R.Escobar
Lepanthes sucumbiensis Luer & Hirtz
Lepanthes sulcata Luer & Hirtz
Lepanthes superposita Schltr.
Lepanthes surrogata Luer & Hirtz
Lepanthes sybax Luer & Hirtz
Lepanthes synema Luer & Hirtz
Lepanthes systole Luer

T

Lepanthes tachirensis Foldats
Lepanthes tactiquensis Archila
Lepanthes tamaensis Foldats
Lepanthes tanekes Luer & R.Escobar
Lepanthes teaguei Luer
Lepanthes tecpanica Luer & Béhar
Lepanthes tectorum Luer & Hirtz
Lepanthes telipogoniflora Schuit. & A.de Wilde
Lepanthes tentaculata Luer & Hirtz
Lepanthes tenuiloba R.E.Schult. & Dillon
Lepanthes tenuis Schltr. in I.Urban
Lepanthes terborchii Luer & Sijm
Lepanthes teres Luer
Lepanthes teretipetala Hespenh. & Dod
Lepanthes terpsichore Luer & Hirtz
Lepanthes tetrachaeta Luer & L.Jost
Lepanthes tetracola Luer & R.Escobar
Lepanthes tetroptera Luer
Lepanthes thalia Luer & Hirtz
Lepanthes thoerleae Luer
Lepanthes thoracica Luer & Hirtz
Lepanthes thurstoniorum Salazar
Lepanthes thylax Luer & Hirtz
Lepanthes thysanota Luer & Hirtz
Lepanthes tibouchinicola Luer & R.Escobar
Lepanthes tigrina Luer & Thoerle
Lepanthes tipulifera Rchb.f.
Lepanthes titanica Luer & Hirtz
Lepanthes tomentosa Luer
Lepanthes tonduziana Schltr.
Lepanthes tortilis Luer & Hirtz
Lepanthes tortuosa Luer & Hirtz
Lepanthes totontepecensis Salazar & Soto Arenas
Lepanthes tracheia Rchb.f.
Lepanthes transparens Luer
Lepanthes triangularis Luer
Lepanthes trichidion Luer
Lepanthes trichocaulis Luer & R.Escobar
Lepanthes trichodactyla Lindl.
Lepanthes tricuspidata Luer & Sijm
Lepanthes tricuspis Schltr.
Lepanthes tridactyla Luer
Lepanthes tridens Ames
Lepanthes tridentata (Sw.) Sw.
Lepanthes trifurcata Luer & R.Escobar
Lepanthes trimerinx Luer
Lepanthes trinaria Luer & R.Escobar
Lepanthes triura (Lindl.) Schltr.
Lepanthes troglodytes Luer & R.Escobar
Lepanthes troxis Luer & R.Escobar
Lepanthes trullifera Hespenh. & Dod
Lepanthes truncata Luer & Dressler
Lepanthes truncatipetala Dod ex Luer
Lepanthes tsubotae Luer & R.Escobar
Lepanthes tubuliflora Hespenh.
Lepanthes tudiana Hespenh. & Dod
Lepanthes × tuerckheimii Schltr.
Lepanthes tungurahuae Luer & Hirtz
Lepanthes turialvae Rchb.f.
Lepanthes turquinoensis Schltr. in I.Urban

U

Lepanthes umbonata Luer & R.Escobar
Lepanthes umbonifera Endres ex Luer
Lepanthes uncifera Luer & R.Escobar
Lepanthes unguicularis Hespenh.
Lepanthes unijuga Luer & Dalström
Lepanthes unitrinervis Carnevali & I.Ramírez
Lepanthes urania Luer & Hirtz
Lepanthes urbaniana Mansf.
Lepanthes uribei Luer
Lepanthes urotepala Rchb.f.
Lepanthes ursula Luer & R.Escobar
Lepanthes usitata Luer & R.Vásquez
Lepanthes uvallensis Archila
Lepanthes uxoria Luer & Hirtz

V

Lepanthes vaginans Luer & Hirtz
Lepanthes vaginosa Luer & Hirtz
Lepanthes valenciae Luer & R.Escobar
Lepanthes valerioi Luer
Lepanthes vareschii Garay
Lepanthes vasquezii Luer
Lepanthes vatrax Luer
Lepanthes velata Luer & Hirtz
Lepanthes veleziana Stimson
Lepanthes velifera Luer & Béhar
Lepanthes vellicata Luer & Hirtz
Lepanthes venusta Luer & R.Escobar
Lepanthes verapazensis Archila
Lepanthes vermicularis Luer
Lepanthes versicolor Luer & R.Vásquez
Lepanthes vespa Luer & R.Vásquez
Lepanthes vespertilio Rchb.f.
Lepanthes vestigialis Bogarín & Pupulin
Lepanthes via-incarum Luer & Hirtz
Lepanthes viahoensis Luer & R.Escobar
Lepanthes vibrissa Luer & Hirtz
Lepanthes viebrockiana Luer & L.Jost
Lepanthes vieirae Luer & R.Escobar
Lepanthes villosa Løjtnant
Lepanthes vinacea Hespenh.
Lepanthes vivipara Salazar & Soto Arenas
Lepanthes vogelii Luer & R.Vásquez
Lepanthes volador Luer & Hirtz
Lepanthes volsella Luer & R.Escobar
Lepanthes volvox Luer & R.Escobar
Lepanthes voodoo Tremblay & Ackerman
Lepanthes vulpina Luer & Sijm

W

Lepanthes wageneri Rchb.
Lepanthes wendlandii Rchb.f.
Lepanthes wendtii Salazar & Soto Arenas
Lepanthes werneri Luer
Lepanthes whittenii Pupulin & Bogarín
Lepanthes williamsii Salazar & Soto Arenas
Lepanthes woodburyana Stimson
Lepanthes woodfredensis Luer
Lepanthes woodiana Fawc. & Rendle
Lepanthes wrightii Rchb.f.
Lepanthes wullschlaegelii Fawc. & Rendle

X

Lepanthes xenos Luer & Hirtz
Lepanthes ximenae Luer

Y

Lepanthes yanganae Luer & Hirtz
Lepanthes yunckeri Ames
Lepanthes yuvilensis Catling

Z

Lepanthes zamorensis Luer & Hirtz
Lepanthes zanklopetala Luer & Hirtz
Lepanthes zapatae Luer & R.Escobar
Lepanthes zapotensis Dod
Lepanthes zelenkoi Luer & Hirtz
Lepanthes zettleri Foldats
Lepanthes zongoensis Luer
Lepanthes zunagensis Luer & Hirtz
Lepanthes zygion Luer

References

Lepanthes